Hermon Camp House is a historic home located at Trumansburg in Tompkins County, New York. It was built in 1845-1847 and consists of a two-story central block  flanked by two slightly lower wings in the Greek Revival style. The main block is dominated by a full-height portico with six fluted Doric order columns supporting full entablature and parapet.  Attached to the west wing of the main block is a carriage house.

It was listed on the National Register of Historic Places in 1973.

The house is privately owned and used as a residence, and so is not open to the public. The owners occasionally
open it for local charity and political events.

References

Houses on the National Register of Historic Places in New York (state)
Houses completed in 1847
Houses in Tompkins County, New York
1847 establishments in New York (state)
National Register of Historic Places in Tompkins County, New York